Zizula hylax, 'the Tiny grass blue is a species of blue butterfly.

Description
Male upperside: dull violet blue, which changes to a brighter tint of violet in certain lights. Forewing: the costa very narrowly, the termen much more broadly dull brown; this edging to the termen in most specimens decreases in width from apex to tornus, and is outwardly followed by an anteciliary darker brown line. Cilia brownish anteriorly, posteriorly brownish at the base with the apical portions white. Hindwing: the ground colour brighter than on the forewing, the costal and terminal margins much more narrowly edged with brown, which edging is merged in the anteciliary dark brown line. Cilia: brown along their basal halves, white apically.

Underside: grey. Forewing: a dusky brown lunular line on the discocellulars; two subcostal spots above the cell, one on either side of the discocellular lunule; a very strongly curved discal series of five spots, of which the posterior three are somewhat lunular in shape and placed obliquely en echelon, the next above these hook shaped, the anterior spot round; both the subcostal spots and the spots of the discal series are black, each narrowly encircled with white; beyond these are inner and outer subterminal dusky lines, which anteriorly are continuous, posteriorly somewhat broken and macular, followed by a very conspicuous jet-black anteciliary slender line. Cilia greyish white, traversed by a medial transverse blackish-brown line. Hindwing: with the following small white-encircled black spots: a subbasal transverse series of three, followed by a highly curved series of eight spots, that curve across the disc of the wing to the costa and along the latter towards the base; discocellulars with a dusky short lunular line as on the forewing; terminal markings and cilia similar, but the outer and broader subterminal line more broken and macular than on the forewing. Antennae black, the shafts ringed with white; head, thorax and abdomen dark brown, with a little violet pubescence on the head and thorax; beneath: palpi, thorax and abdomen greyish white.

Female upperside: glossy brown, without any violet tint whatever; the anteciliary darker brown lines on both forewings and hindwings well marked. Underside: very similar to that of the male, the ground colour a shade darker, the markings slightly larger and more prominent. Antenna, head, thorax and abdomen as in the male, but the latter three without a trace of violet or blue on the upperside.

Distribution
The tiny grass blue is found in several races throughout tropical and subtropical Africa, Asia, and Oceania, including India, Japan, the Philippines, Singapore, Eswatini, north and east coasts of Australia and also in southern Australia.

Life history
They are laid singly on buds and flowers of a food plant. The sides are hairy, and the head is pale brown. The pupa is 0.7 cm long, hairy and green, and is attached to a stem or the underside of a leaf of a food plant.

Food plants
Food plants include various members of the family Acanthaceae. Species noted include Hygrophila auriculata and Phaulopsis dorsiflora.

References

Further reading
Cowan, C.F., 1965. Comment on the proposed designation of a type species for Pithecops Horsfield, 1828. Z.N (S.) 1675. Bulletin of Zoological Nomenclature 22 (4):209-210.
 
 
 
 ICZN. Opinion 822, 1967. Pithecops Horsfield, [1828] designation of a type species under the plenary powers. Bulletin of Zoological Nomenclature 24' (4):216-217.

External links

Polyommatini
Butterflies of Africa
Butterflies of Asia
Butterflies of Oceania
Butterflies of Australia
Butterflies of Singapore
Butterflies described in 1775
Taxa named by Johan Christian Fabricius